Jakob Lilja (born 23 July 1993) is a Swedish professional ice hockey forward currently playing for HC Dynamo Moscow of the Kontinental Hockey League (KHL).

Playing career
Lilja made his Elitserien (now the SHL) debut playing with Rögle BK during the 2012–13 Elitserien season.
 
In the 2018–19 season, Lilja registered 12 goals and 25 assists for a career high 37 points in 52 games with Djurgårdens IF. Leading the club and finishing tied 8th in the SHL in assists, and 10th in points, he added 8 points in 19 playoff games to help reach the SHL finals.

Having made 222 appearances in the top flight SHL, Lilja gained the interest of NHL clubs as an undrafted free agent. He later agreed to pursue a North American career with the Columbus Blue Jackets, signing a one-year, entry-level contract on June 15, 2019.

In his first North American season in 2019–20, Lilja made the Blue Jackets opening night roster out of training camp and made his NHL debut against the Toronto Maple Leafs on 4 October 2019. Given a role on the fourth-line, Lilja appeared in 37 games over the course of the regular season, registering 2 goals and 5 points. He split the season with AHL affiliate, the Cleveland Monsters, notching 13 points through 25 contests.

After receiving permission by the Blue Jackets to find a new team during the suspension of the NHL season due to the COVID-19 pandemic, Lilja went to play in Kazakhstan after he was signed to a one-year deal with Kazakh club, Barys Nur-Sultan of the KHL, on 24 June 2020.

Lilya played two seasons with Barys Nur-Sultan before continuing in the KHL on a two-year contract with Russian based club, HC Dynamo Moscow, on 1 August 2022.

Assault case
On March 5, 2015 Lilja, while with Rögle BK in Allsvenskan, cross-checked Malmö Redhawks player Jens Olsson from behind in the neck, for which he earned a 10-game suspension. The incident was later brought up in court on an assault charge where on July 10, 2018 the Supreme Court of Sweden, after the case had first gone through the lower District Court of Malmö, handed Lilja a one-month probation sentence.

Career statistics

References

External links

1993 births
Living people
Barys Nur-Sultan players
Cleveland Monsters players
Columbus Blue Jackets players
Djurgårdens IF Hockey players
HC Dynamo Moscow players
Linköping HC players
Rögle BK players
Swedish ice hockey left wingers
IF Troja/Ljungby players
Undrafted National Hockey League players
Kazakhstani ice hockey left wingers